Agonopterix fruticosella is a moth of the family Depressariidae. It is found in southern France and on the Iberian Peninsula.

The wingspan is 20–23 mm. The forewings are pale stony cinereous (ash grey) evenly speckled with small groups of blackish scales. The hindwings are shining, pale tawny cinereous.

The larvae feed on Bupleurum rigidum species. They initially mine the leaves of their host plant. The mine has the form of a broad, brownish, full depth corridor. Later, the larva vacates the mine and continues window feeding. There are often several mines in a single leaf. Even later, the larva lives free under a spinning and eventually folds a leaf margin fastening it with silk. Larvae can be found at the end of June.

References

Moths described in 1903
Agonopterix
Moths of Europe